The 2018 Emporia State Hornets football team represented Emporia State University in the 2018 NCAA Division II football season. The Hornets played their home games on Jones Field at Francis G. Welch Stadium in Emporia, Kansas, as they have done since 1937. 2018 was the 121st season in school history. The Hornets are led by head coach Garin Higgins, who is in his 17th season overall, and 12th season at Emporia State as head coach. Emporia State has been a member of the Mid-America Intercollegiate Athletics Association (MIAA) since 1991.

Preseason
The Hornets enter the 2018 season after finishing with a 6–5 overall and in conference play last season under Higgins. On July 31, 2018 at the MIAA Football Media Day, the Hornets were chosen to finish fifth in both the Coaches Poll and Media Polls.

Personnel

Coaching staff
Along with Higgins, there are 9 assistants.

Roster

Schedule

Game notes, regular season

Northeastern State

Pittsburg State

Nebraska–Kearney

Lindenwood

Northwest Missouri

Fort Hays State

Central Missouri

Missouri Western

Washburn

Missouri Southern

Central Oklahoma

Corsicana Bowl: Arkansas–Monticello

References

Emporia State
Emporia State Hornets football seasons
Emporia State Hornets football